Fouts is a surname. Notable people with the surname include:

 Bob Fouts (1921–2019), American sports announcer
 Dan Fouts (born 1951), American football player and sports announcer
 Deborah Fouts, American anthropologist
 Denham Fouts (1914–1948), American socialite and male prostitute
 Dick Fouts (1933–2003), American player of Canadian football
 Jack Fouts (1925–2012), American football player and coach
 James R. Fouts (born 1942), American educator and mayor
 Montana Fouts (born 2000), American softball player
 Roger Fouts (born 1943), American primate researcher
 Theron J. Fouts (1893–1954), American football player and coach
 Tom Fouts (1918–2004), American writer

See also
 Fout, another surname